My Date with a Vampire III is a 2004 Hong Kong television series produced by Asia Television (ATV) as a sequel to My Date with a Vampire (1998) and My Date with a Vampire II (2000). The series starred many cast members from the first two seasons. Like the first two seasons, My Date with a Vampire III also blends aspects of the Chinese "hopping" corpses of jiangshi fiction with those of western vampires, while incorporating elements of Chinese mythology, eschatology and time travel, with more focus on Chinese mythology in this season as compared to the first two.

Plot 
At the end of the second season, set in early 2001, Fong Tin-yau, Ma Siu-ling, and their allies succeeded in preventing the goddess Nüwa from ending the world. Three years later, another eschatological event is about to happen.

In ancient times, the immortal Fuxi, the King of Humankind, desired to create a paradise called the Eternal Country in the human world. However, he came into conflict with his lover, the goddess Yaochi Shengmu (Holy Mother of the Shining Lake), because the latter's mission is to bring death and disease upon humankind. Fuxi eventually broke up with Yaochi Shengmu and started a new relationship with Chang'e under his alter ego, Houyi. However, he lost Chang'e when she flew to the moon after consuming a magic pill from Yaochi Shengmu. Fuxi blamed Yaochi Shengmu for separating him and Chang'e, and fought with his ex-lover. The elders of the Pangu clan intervened by imprisoning Yaochi Shengmu in Heaven while Fuxi remains in the human world.

Fong Tin-yau and Ma Siu-ling are living happily in Heaven after their success in 2001. However, in 2004, Yaochi Shengmu breaks free and introduces a deadly virus to wipe out the entire Pangu clan. Fong, who is infected by the virus and is on the verge of dying, manages to send Ma back to the human world. Ma has to find ways to stop an imminent clash between Fuxi and Yaochi Shengmu because that could lead to the end of the world.

Upon returning to the human world, Ma travels back in time to the Song dynasty to find Fong's previous incarnation, Arrowhead, and brings him back to present-day Hong Kong to help her. At the same time, she meets her family members — her parents Ma Dai-lung and Tong Gam-bo, and her twin brother Ma Siu-fu — whom she has never seen before. She also encounters a strange girl called Fong Tin-ngai, who turns out to be her daughter from the future. She is eventually reunited with Fong Tin-yau again.

Just as relations between Fuxi and Yaochi Shengmu start to improve, and the situation becomes more stable, Fong Tin-yau, Ma Siu-ling, and their allies are confronted by Destiny, the entity that controls and dictates the fates of all beings in the universe. They need to overcome Destiny in order to change the fate of the world.

Vampires 
See My Date with a Vampire#Vampires for a description of the vampires depicted in this television series.

Cast 
 Eric Wan as Fong Tin-yau, a second-generation vampire and Ma Siu-ling's lover.
 Eric Wan also portrayed Arrowhead, a Song dynasty warrior serving under the general Yue Fei. He travels through time to present-day Hong Kong, where he assumes Fong Tin-yau's identity and helps Ma Siu-ling.
 Joey Meng as Ma Siu-ling, Fong Tin-yau's lover. After her daughter accidentally bites her, she turns into a hybrid vampire more powerful than first-generation vampires and takes on a darker personality when her original "good" identity is suppressed in her mind.
 Kenneth Chan as Yuen-ngan But-po, a Jin dynasty general who became a vampire after consuming a peach from a cursed tree planted by Yaochi Shengmu. He is still alive in present-day Hong Kong and has taken on a new name as Yuen But-po.
 Mark Cheng as Fuxi, the King of Humankind. As the first man to come into existence, he has been authorised by divine forces to oversee the human world. Over the centuries, he has adopted numerous identities, including the archer Houyi, before he finally decided to suppress his immortality and live as a normal man named Yam Hei. He is forced to "reawaken" when Yaochi Shengmu returns and threatens the world.
 Alice Chan as Yaochi Shengmu, a goddess in charge of bringing death and disease upon humankind. She breaks free after being imprisoned for centuries and returns to the human world, where she disguises herself as a romance writer named Yiu Ging.
 Ruco Chan as Ho Yau-kau, Ho Ying-kau's younger brother who became a fortune-teller called Mr. Heaven-Transcendent. He is later possessed by Destiny, the entity which dictates the fate of the universe.
 Pinky Cheung as Yuen-ngan Mo-lui, Yuen-ngan But-po's sister and a sorceress who has survived for 800 years due to a magic bracelet. She meets Mr. X by chance and falls in love with him.
 Berg Ng as Mr. X, a vampire who has only one fang and fears sunlight. He meets Yuen-ngan Mo-lui and falls in love with her.
 Teresa Mak as Mou Yau, a descendant of Mou Siu-fong, the protagonist in Vampire Expert. She works in the police force and leads a SDU squad dealing with supernatural cases.
 Cheung Kwok-kuen as Fuk-sang, the boy vampire in the first two seasons who is now a normal schoolboy.
 Kylie Kwok as Fong Tin-ngai, Fong Tin-yau and Ma Siu-ling's daughter from the post-apocalyptic future who has been sent back in time to help her parents prevent the world from ending in 2004.
 Ricky Chan as Ma Siu-fu, Ma Siu-ling's twin brother and an incarnation of the bodhisattva Ksitigarbha.
 Tats Lau as Ma Dai-lung, Ma Siu-ling and Ma Siu-fu's father.
 Mango Wong as Tong Gam-bo, Ma Siu-ling and Ma Siu-fu's mother.
 Asuka Higuchi as Chang'e, Fuxi's second lover who flew to the moon.
 Wong Shee-tong as Ho Ying-kau, a powerful sorcerer and Ma Siu-ling's ally who died in the second season. He has taken over Ksitigarbha's duties in the Underworld, serving as a surrogate in the bodhisattva's absence.
 Qin Lan as Ngok Ngan-ping, Ngok Fei's daughter who served under her father as a warrior in the Song army.
 Norman Chu as Ngok Fei, a Song dynasty general who led the Song army in the war between the Song and Jin dynasties.
 Remus Kam as Lau-sing / Nick, Lo-Tsui's son who served under Ngok Fei. After his death, he became a guardian tasked with escorting the spirits of the dead to the Underworld.
 Andrew Yuen as Zaijie Jushi, an immortal who told Ngok Ngan-ping about the paradise world of Kunlun.
 Geoffrey Wong as Mars, the ground team leader of the SDU squad dealing with supernatural cases.
 William Chow as Sky, a member of the SDU squad.
 Cheuk Wai-man as Kary, a member of the SDU squad.
 Sin Ho-ying as Lo-gwai, a member of the SDU squad.
 Yen Si-yu as Big R, a member of the SDU squad.
 Chan Lok-man as Small R, Big R's younger brother and a member of the SDU squad.
 Idea Ng as Wu-lung, a member of the SDU squad who betrays his squad mates.
 Yuen Man-chun as Muk-chuen, a member of the SDU squad.
 Vivian To as June, Ho Yau-kau's lover.
 Wong Oi-yiu as Lam-lam, Fuxi's third lover and fiancée in present-day Hong Kong.
 Bobby Tsang as Lo-Tsui, Lau-sing's father and Arrowhead's comrade-in-arms.
 Cheng Syu-fung as Lui Wong, Yuen-ngan Bat-po's deputy.
 Jason Pai as the human form of the Divine Dragon who had served the Ma clan for generations and helped them defeat numerous evil supernatural beings.
 Kwan Wai-lun as Officer Chan, a corrupt officer in the police force who supervises the SDU squad.

See also 
 List of vampire television series

External links 
  My Date with a Vampire III official page on ATV's website

2004 Hong Kong television series debuts
2004 Hong Kong television series endings
Asia Television original programming
Hong Kong time travel television series
Vampires in television
Jiangshi fiction
Romantic fantasy television series